The following highways are numbered 23A:

United States
Maryland Route 23A (former)
 Nebraska Spur 23A
 County Route 23A (Monmouth County, New Jersey)
 New York State Route 23A
 County Route 23A (Rockland County, New York)
 County Route 23A (Schuyler County, New York)